Twomey is an Irish Gaelic clan based most prominently in what is today County Cork. The paternal ancestors of the clan are of the Corcu Loígde; the Twomey clan originated from Donnchadh na Tuaima who was himself a member of the O'Leary family. The Twomey family motto is "fortis undis et armis" which translates to 'strong waves and arms'.

List of people
The name may refer to:
Anne Carolyn Twomey (born 1951), American stage, film, and television actress
Anne Frances Twomey, Australian legal academic
Bill Twomey Jr. (1927–1996), Australian rules football player
Bill Twomey Sr. (1899–1977), Australian rules football player
Billy Twomey (born 1977), Irish equestrian
Chris Twomey (born 1954), American artist and filmmaker
Christina Twomey, Australian historian
Cillian Twomey, Irish geriatric consultant
Clare Twomey (born 1968), London-based visual artist and researcher
 Colum Twomey (born 1983), Chemical Engineer 
David Twomey (born 1961), Australian rules footballer
David M. Twomey (born 1928), Lieutenant General USMC
Frank Twomey (born 1950s), man from children's television programme Bosco
Hugh Twomey (1920–1989), Canadian physician and politician
Jeremiah F. Twomey (1874–1963), New York politician
Jeremiah Twomey (1847–1921), journalist and Member of the New Zealand Legislative Council
 Joanne Twomey
Joe Twomey (fl. mid-20th century), Irish hurler
John Twomey (disambiguation), several people
Kay Twomey (1914–1995), American songwriter and music arranger
Liam Twomey (born 1967), Irish Fine Gael politician from Wexford
Margaret Twomey (born 1963), Australian diplomat; ambassador to Russia (2008-2012)
Mathilda Twomey, Seychellois lawyer and academic
Mick Twomey (1931–2015), Australian rules football player
Moss (Maurice) Twomey (1897–1978), Irish republican; chief of staff of the IRA
Nora Twomey (born 1971), Irish animator and filmmaker
Pat Twomey (1929–1969), Australian rules football player
Patrick Joseph Twomey (1892–1963)
Paul Twomey (born 1961), American business consultant; CEO of ICANN
Seamus Twomey (1919–1989), Irish republican; twice chief of the Provisional IRA
Seán Ó Tuama (1926–2006), Irish poet, playwright and academic
Seán Twomey (born 2000), Irish hurler
Sharon Twomey (born 1964), Irish actress
Vincent Twomey (born 1941), Irish priest
Vincy Twomey (1929–1993), Irish hurler
Wayde Twomey (born 1986), Australian rules footballer

See also 

 Mount Twomey
Twomey Cellars, a winery in California
Twomey effect
 Twomey, Alberta

Surnames of Irish origin